Zielona Góra is the largest city in Lubusz Voivodeship, located in western Poland, with 140,403 inhabitants. Zielona Góra has a favourable geographical position, being close to the Polish-German border and on several international road and rail routes connecting Scandinavia with Southern Europe and Warsaw with Berlin. The region is closely associated with vineyards and holds an annual Wine Fest. Zielona Góra is one of the two capital cities of Lubusz Voivodeship, hosting the province's elected assembly, while the seat of the centrally appointed governor is in the city of Gorzów Wielkopolski.

History
The city's history began when Polish Duke Henry the Bearded brought first settlers to the area in 1222. In 1323 Zielona Góra was granted town privileges. The town was incorporated into the Kingdom of Bohemia in 1506. As part of Bohemia, in 1526 it became part of the Habsburg Empire and experienced a wave of witch trials in the 17th century. As a result of the First Silesian War, the city was annexed by Prussia and was also part of Germany from 1871 until the end of World War II in 1945. In accordance with the Potsdam Agreement, the province was handed over to Poland and resettled with Poles, most of whom came from central Poland, but some also had been expelled from the Eastern Borderlands.

The first settlement in the area of Zielona Góra was built in the valley near the Złota Łącza stream during the reign of the Polish ruler Mieszko I. The oldest settlement was agricultural. It later developed into a trading point along routes from Poznań to Żagań and further to Łużyce. The written records of the Slavic settlement date to 1222 and an increase of its population by Henry the Bearded. Other documents date the settlement to 1302.

The region received an influx of German burghers in the second half of the 13th century during the medieval Ostsiedlung. In 1323, the settlement became a city with Crossener Recht, a variation of Magdeburg rights. The earliest mention of the town's coat of arms is from 1421, although it is believed to have been arranged since the beginning of the 14th century. A document in the town archive of Thorn (Toruń) dating from before 1400 used a sigil with the name GRVNINBERG, an early form of the German name Grünberg.

In 1294, Duke Henryk III of the Duchy of Głogów, founded a church in honour of Saint Hedwig, the High Duchess consort of Poland and patron saint of Silesia. Now designated a co-cathedral, it is the oldest building in the city. A wooden castle near the city, built ca. 1272, was the residence of Duke John of Ścinawa from 1358 to 1365. Janusz had ceded his lands to Duke Henry V of Iron. In 1477 the town defeated a 5,000-strong army from neighbouring Brandenburg which attempted to seize it during the succession war to the Duchy of Głogów. In 1488, Duke John II of Żagań, destroyed the castle to prevent his enemies from using it.

The deposition of Duke John II of Żagań in 1488 marked the end of the long rule of the Piast dynasty in the Duchy of Głogów and the city of Zielona Góra. Later on, the duchy was ruled by the future Kings of Poland John I Albert and Sigismund I the Old. It was integrated with the Kingdom of Bohemia in 1506, although Polish king Sigismund I the Old still claimed his rights to the city in 1508.

The city flourished during the reign of Sigismund I the Old. In 1505 Sigismund issued a privilege allowing the sale of cloth products from Zielona Góra throughout Poland. In 1641, King Władysław IV Vasa of Poland confirmed these rights. Another important branch of the city's economy at this time was winemaking.

The city converted to Lutheranism during the Protestant Reformation through the efforts of Paul Lemberg, Abbot of Sagan. The city declined during the 17th century, especially during the Thirty Years' War (1618–48) and following decades. Grünberg endured plundering, debts, emigration of burghers, and fires. In 1651 during the Counter Reformation, the Habsburg monarchy of Austria reintroduced Roman Catholicism and suppressed Protestantism.

The city was subjected to heavy Germanisation and German craftsmen banned Poles from attending any practice allowing them to work as members of guilds. A rebellion caused by conscription ended with many Poles being imprisoned. From 1640, witch trials took place, the number of which increased significantly in 1663–1665. As a result, in 1669 the local court was deprived of the right to impose the death penalty on women accused of witchcraft.

The city was annexed by the Kingdom of Prussia by the 1742 Treaty of Breslau which ended the First Silesian War. The Prussians introduced religious toleration, leading to the construction of the Protestant parish church Zum Garten Christ from 1746 to 1747. Catholic Poles were later discriminated against, however. In 1758, during the Seven Years' War, POWs brought the plague to the city.

The city's textile industry was booming by the end of the 1700s. By 1800, large parts of the city walls had been dismantled to allow the city to expand. The textile industry suffered during the 1820s while adjusting to the Industrial Revolution and an import ban by the Russian Empire. The city's economy began to recover after many clothiers emigrated to Congress Poland. English industrialists were among the 19th-century economic reformers of Zielona Góra.

During industrialisation, many Germans from the countryside moved to large industrial cities and a large number of Poles came to German cities to work as well. The Polish population was pushed by Germanisation to rural villages, although some remained in the town contributed to the economic revival of the city. A Polish church remained functional until 1809 and a Polish craftsmen association (Towarzystwo Polskich Rzemieślników) was established by Kazimierz Lisowski in 1898; it existed till 1935 when Lisowski was murdered by the Gestapo. In 1923 a branch of the Union of Poles in Germany was established. In 1932 the German authorities did not allow the establishment of a Polish school.

Since 1816 after the Napoleonic Wars, Grünberg was administered within the district Landkreis Grünberg in the Province of Silesia. In 1871 it became part of the German Empire during the unification of Germany. English industrialists purchased some of the city's textile factories during the 1870s and 1880s. By 1885, most of Grünberg's population of 14,396 were Protestants. The city was first connected to the Glogau (Głogów)-Grünberg (Zielona Góra)-Guben railway line in 1871, followed by connections to Christianstadt (Nowogród Bobrzański) in 1904, Wollstein (Wolsztyn) in 1905, and a local line to Sprottau (Szprotawa) in 1911.

In 1919, Grünberg became part of the Province of Lower Silesia within Weimar Germany. On 1 April 1922 it became a district-free city, but this status was revoked on 1 October 1933 while part of Nazi Germany. During the Kristallnacht in 1938, the Germans destroyed the synagogue. During World War II the Germans established a women's subcamp of the Gross-Rosen concentration camp, 11 forced labour camps and 4 labour units of the POW camp in Żagań, intended for French, Italian and Soviet prisoners of war.

When asked about the specifics of the city in mid-February 1945, the historian says that it was not an abandoned city, it had interesting food resources. Hence, an agreement was reached between the local command of the Red Army and the German inhabitants. In addition, there was a long uncertainty as to the course of the border that could have been drawn on the Oder River, and finally, the relatively late takeover of the city by the Polish authorities.
"People were faster than the authorities, but we also need to understand the risks that people moving westward took in those early days," adds Prof. Osękowski. - Lack of information, the ongoing war, the Germans who still feel confident ... Anyway, it was a terrible time, people were terrified, regardless of nationality. Anything could have happened.

On On February 11, 1945, the authorities of Zielona Góra, then still Grünberg, received a report about Russians in the vicinity of Nowa Sól. Wehrmacht soldiers and civilians organizing defense in cities were threatened with being cut off from the south-west. In this situation, the preparations of Zielona Góra for defense by regular troops were interrupted. On February 11 the Yalta Conference has ended and it was not known exactly what would happen to Zielona Góra. On February 12 the most important German offices and management boards of larger enterprises were evacuated beyond Nysa Łużycka. On February 13 other residents were encouraged to leave the city through megaphones. The last train left in the evening. One of the previously sent transports was hit by an English air attack in Dresden and, according to some, about 900 inhabitants of Zielona Góra died at the local railway station. On 14th of February. Hitler's ardent supporters called on the Hitler Youth to defend themselves. Previously, the so-called Sonderkommando, which from the morning started blowing up strategic objects and immobilizing various technical devices, e.g. power plants, gas plants and waterworks. The defenders set up two machine guns on the Branibor Hill. However, having heard about the imminent threat from Nowa Sól, they withdrew to the city center. On the other hand, the supporters of a quick surrender, including the worker Alfred Kuntzel, the Nazi Friedrich Brucks and the communist Karl Laube formed a surrender committee. The Soviet Red Army occupied Grünberg with little fighting on February 14, 1945, during World War II. 

The Red Army headed by the Third Army began by the artillery fire at 13:00 from cannons positioned on the hills south of Racula. After reaching the northern border of this village, the reconnaissance units moved towards the city. The main unit entered the city along Wrocławska Street. Soon, small groups of Red Army soldiers began to appear from the side of Kożuchowska Street. The 3rd Army set his headquarters in the Poviat Office building.

In that period, about 500 people committed suicide. The following month, according to the post-war Potsdam Agreement, the town was placed under Polish administration under territorial compensation for the territories of former Eastern Poland annexed by the Soviet Union. The remaining German inhabitants who had not fled their homes from the Eastern Front were expelled in accordance with the Potsdam Agreement.

The town was partly resettled with Poles transferred from Polish areas annexed by the Soviet Union. The city was briefly renamed Zielonogóra in 1945, before the historic Polish name Zielona Góra was restored. The 18th-century Protestant church was reconsecrated as a Catholic church (Kościół Matki Boskiej Częstochowskiej). The city's first post-war mayor was Tomasz Sobkowiak, a former prisoner of the Auschwitz concentration camp during the German occupation of Poland. He is remembered as an efficient administrator, with a friendly attitude towards Germans.

From 1950 to 1998 Zielona Góra was the capital of the Zielona Góra Voivodeship.

The University of Zielona Góra was opened in 2001. The city is also the seat of the Roman Catholic Diocese of Zielona Góra-Gorzów.

Geography
Zielona Góra is surrounded by tree-covered hills. The adjacent woodland makes up approximately half of the city's total area. The name of the city translates to 'Green Mountain' in both Polish and German. Zielona Góra features several tourist attractions and important historical sites including the preserved medieval Old Town, 13th-century Market Square, tenements, palaces, parks and the famous Palm House on Wine Hill. Its strong connection to vineyards and grape-picking earned Zielona Góra the nickname "The City of Wine".

Wineries
The city has been known for its wines for centuries. It is now one of two places in Poland with wine grape cultivation mainly for white wines (the other being the wine growing region near the town of Warka in Masovia). The first wineries around the city were built in 1314. At the Paradyż Abbey near Zielona Góra, monks have been making wine since 1250. The number of vineyards at peak production is estimated at 4,000 in the region, with 2,500 in Zielona Góra itself.

During the communist era wine production was reduced, but since 1990 it has recovered. Since 1852, an annual wine festival has taken place in the town. Wine is no longer produced in Zielona Góra itself, with the last factory closed in the early 1990s.

Vodka Luksusowa (namely: Luxury vodka), made from potatoes rather than grain, is produced in distillery in Zielona Góra.

Climate
The climate is oceanic (Köppen: Cfb) with some humid continental characteristics (Dfb) in normals previous to 1981–2010. Despite being some distance from the sea, western standards as well as air masses are still predominant in the western than eastern, not very different from German cities near the border.

Education

The city has a university and a College of International Trade and Finance. Currently there are 18,000 students studying in the city.

Secondary education
Secondary education is based on the high school type of educational facility.
 I High School
 III High School
 IV High School
 V High School
 Seventh General Lyceum
 Schools of Electronics
 Schools of Economics

Universities and colleges
 University of Zielona Góra 
 From 1997 until 2014: College of International Trade and Finance

Transport
Zielona Góra Airport is located at Babimost, north-east of the city. It is currently the eleventh busiest airport in Poland, in terms of traffic size. Formerly a military base, it has become an important transport hub for western Poland. LOT Polish Airlines currently offers daily flights to Warsaw.

Zielona Góra Główna railway station is the most important railway station of Zielona Góra. It has train connections to Gorzów Wielkopolski, Zbąszynek, Rzepin, Warsaw, Frankfurt (Oder) and Krakow, main cities of the surrounding regions: Poznań, Szczecin and Wrocław as well as direct international connections to Berlin, Vienna.

The city lies at the junction of National Road 3, National Road 27 and National Road 32 and is a major interchange on S3 Expressway along European route E65.

Events
June/July: Busker Bus Festival
August: Folk Song and Dance Festival Folk Festival 
September: Winobranie (Wine Fest)

Sports

The city is home to Zastal Zielona Góra, five times champion of the Polish Basketball League and member of the European Basketball Champions League. The team plays its home games at the CRS Hall Zielona Góra. It is also home to Falubaz Zielona Góra, one of the most successful Polish speedway clubs. The local football team is Lechia Zielona Góra.

Notable people

Bartholomaeus Pitiscus (1561–1613), mathematician, theologian, astronomer
Abraham Scultetus (1566–1625), theologian
Tadeusz Kuntze (1727–1793), painter
Rudolf Haym (1821–1901), philosopher
Wilhelm Foerster (1832–1921), astronomer
Otto Julius Bierbaum (1865–1910), writer
Susanne Dessoir (1869–1953), soprano
Franz Mattenklott (1884–1954), general 
Józef Zych (born 1938), lawyer and politician
Prince Franz Wilhelm of Prussia (born 1943) great-grandson of Kaiser Wilhelm II.
Maryla Rodowicz (born 1945), singer
Jürgen Colombo (born 1949), bicyclist
Janusz C. Szajna (born 1954), entrepreneur and University of Zielona Góra professor
Andrew Andrzej Twardon (born 1956), psychologist
Maria Gładkowska (born 1957), actress
Olga Tokarczuk (born 1962), writer (laureate of Nobel Prize in Literature)
Tomasz Lis (born 1966), journalist
Mariusz Linke (born 1969), mixed martial arts fighter and world-class grappler
Grzegorz Halama (born 1970), comedian
Agnieszka Haupe-Kalka (born 1970), writer
Piotr Protasiewicz (born 1975), speedway rider
L.U.C (born 1981), rapper
Grzegorz Zengota (born 1988), speedway rider

Twin towns – sister cities

Zielona Góra is twinned with:

 L'Aquila, Italy (1996)
 Bistriţa, Romania (2001)
 Cottbus, Germany (1990)
 Helmond, Netherlands (1993)
 Ivano-Frankivsk, Ukraine (2000)
 Kraljevo, Serbia (1974)
 Nitra, Slovakia (1992)
 Troyes, France (1970)
 Verden an der Aller, Germany (1993)
 Batumi, Georgia (2022)
 Wuxi, China (2009)
 Zittau, Germany (2010)

Friendly cities
 Soltau, Germany (1997)

Gallery

Notes

References

Bibliography

External links

Grünberg church records of births, marriages and deaths since 1582
Municipal website
Zielona Góra University
Jewish Community in Zielona Góra on Virtual Shtetl
The Death March through Zielona Góra to Volary, at Yad Vashem website
Grünberg Notgeld (emergency banknotes) depicting various episodes from the region's history.

 
Cities and towns in Lubusz Voivodeship
Cities in Silesia
City counties of Poland